Charlie Booth (born January 16, 1997) is an American soccer player who currently plays for FC Tucson in USL League One.

Playing career

College and amateur
Booth began his college soccer career at Bryant University in 2015, where he played three seasons before redshirting for the 2018 season due to a sports hernia operation. In 2016, Booth was named as a NEC All-Conference Second Team selection. For his senior year, Booth transferred to the University of Rhode Island.

Whilst at college, Booth played in the USL League Two with GPS Portland Phoenix in 2017, and Flint City Bucks in 2019, where he helped the team win the 2019 league title.

FC Tucson
On January 28, 2020, Booth signed with USL League One side FC Tucson. He made his professional debut on August 8, 2020, starting in a 2–1 loss to Union Omaha.

References 

1997 births
American soccer players
Association football defenders
FC Tucson players
Flint City Bucks players
GPS Portland Phoenix players
Living people
People from Concord, Massachusetts
Rhode Island Rams men's soccer players
Soccer players from Massachusetts
Sportspeople from Middlesex County, Massachusetts
USL League One players
USL League Two players